Cornukaempferia larsenii is a species in the ginger family, Zingiberaceae. It was first described by Piyaporn Saensouk.

It is named after Danish botanist Kai Larsen.

Range
Cornukaempferia larsenii is native to Thailand and Laos.

References

Zingiberoideae
Flora of Thailand
Flora of Laos